Finghin Ó Mathghamhna (died 1496) was an Irish clan leader and literary scribe.

A local lord from Fonn Iartharhach in south-west County Cork. In 1475 he produced an Irish translation of The Buke of John Manderville for whomsoever would fain know the best way to wend from every country to Jerusalem and the holy places that are there about. It survives in three manuscripts: Rennes, Bibliothèque Municipale 598, ff.52a2–68b2;
British Library, Egerton 1781, ff.129a–146b and London, British Library, Additional 33,993, ff. 6a–7a (fragment).

The Annals of the Four Masters note his death in 1496, calling him "saoi eccnaidhe illaidin agust i mBerla/a wise man, learned in the Latin and English languages."

References

Sources

 'The Gaelic Abridgement of the Book of Ser Marco Polo', Z.C.P., i, 1897, Whitley Strokes, pp. 245–73, 362-438, 603.
 The Gaelic Maundeville, Z.C.P., ii, 1898, Whitley Strokes, pp. 1–63.

External links
 http://www.ucc.ie/celt/published/T100005D/index.html

1496 deaths
Medieval Gaels from Ireland
People from County Cork
15th-century Irish writers
Irish book and manuscript collectors
15th-century Irish people
Irish-language writers